Battleground Telangana: Chronicle of an Agitation is a book written by Kingshuk Nag, a journalist and editor of The Times of India, about the Telangana movement in and before the formation of the state of Andhra Pradesh, India. It was released in July 2011.

Synopsis
The book traces the history of the Telangana region and explains the cultural backgrounds of that and the Andhra region. It discusses its past during the rule of the Nizams of Hyderabad, its people's fight for basic needs, as well as the Andhra region under the British Raj era when it was part of Madras Presidency.

References

External links
 Book review on IBN live

Books about politics of India
History of Telangana
Telangana movement
2011 non-fiction books
21st-century Indian books
HarperCollins books